Discography of Funkadelic, influential George Clinton-led funk music group.

Albums

Studio albums

Funkadelic

Fuzzy Haskins, Calvin Simon, and Grady Thomas recording as Funkadelic

Live albums

Compilation albums

Singles

References 
General

Specific

References

External links

Funkadelic albums
Rhythm and blues discographies
Rock music group discographies
Discographies of American artists
Funk music discographies